Titov Vrv is the highest peak of the Šar Mountains at .

Name 
The summit's original name is "Big Turk". In 1934, the peak was renamed to Mount Aleksandar, in honor of Aleksandar I of Yugoslavia, after his assassination. During World War II, the Bulgarian authorities restored its original name. The peak was renamed in 1953 in honor of Josip Broz Tito. The name has remained unchanged since Macedonian independence in 1991, however in other neighboring languages such as Turkish, Albanian, and Bulgarian it is still known as the "Big Turk". Тhe smaller neighboring peak is known as "Small Turk".

Activity
Every year, on the last weekend of May, the Ljuboten mountain club holds a climb to this peak.

In December 2022, the inside of the tower at the top of the peak was vandalized.

Gallery

See also 

 List of places named after Josip Broz Tito
 Šar Mountains
 Korab (mountain)

References

Notes
 

Two-thousanders of North Macedonia
Šar Mountains